The soprano sarrusophone is a high-pitched sarrusophone, a family of keyed metal double reed instruments with a conical bore. It is pitched in B♭ and its range is approximately the same as that of the soprano saxophone. The timbre is similar to that of the oboe, although louder and less refined, more like a shawm. Although used in wind bands in the late 19th and early 20th centuries, it is today extremely rare, as few original specimens survive. New instruments can still be purchased on a special order basis from instrument manufacturer Orsi of Milan, Italy.

References

Sarrusophones
Single oboes with conical bore